Harry Martin (1889 – 22 July 1922) was a Canadian cyclist. He competed in two events at the 1920 Summer Olympics.

References

External links
 

1889 births
1922 deaths
Canadian male cyclists
Olympic cyclists of Canada
Cyclists at the 1920 Summer Olympics
Cyclists from Vienna